Basil "Manenberg" Coetzee (2 February 1944 – 11 March 1998) was a South African musician, perhaps best known as a saxophonist.

Biography
Coetzee was born in District Six, Cape Town, South Africa. Mountain Records describes Coetzee thus: His distinctive raunchy tenor sound and the untiring commitment to his cultural roots made him one of the best known jazzmen to come out of South Africa. He earned the nickname "Manenberg" after the hugely successful collaboration with Dollar Brand in the late seventies. Basil toured and recorded extensively with Brand (Abdullah Ibrahim). Together with Robbie Jansen they created the unique brass sound of the group The Pacific Express inspiring many younger cape jazz musicians in Cape Town.

He is probably best known for his recording work with Abdullah Ibrahim (previously known as Dollar Brand). Ibrahim recorded his composition "Mannenberg" with Coetzee – it became an enormous hit in the townships and impressed musicians as the recording is reputed to have been made in just one take.

Abdullah Ibrahim is quoted by the BBC as saying, "Even Basil himself said that in later years he would use that solo as a study exercise. We also use it now in our teaching as a required solo that young musicians have to play."

The composition "Manenberg" became a South African jazz classic, and is also internationally renowned (indeed, a visit to the Cape Town waterfront will still today reward the jazz enthusiast with the "Manenberg" jazz venue).

An article in The Scotsman records that "Coetzee developed a soulful, gospel-influenced instrumental voice which had a raw, impassioned urgency at its core. He often explained that his sound was reflection of the life around him, a product of the fact that 'there's a lot of poverty in the townships, and people are frustrated, and my sound is created within that environment.'"

Coetzee was signed to the Cape Town based Mountain Records label for a large part of his recording career and made his only solo albums for the label.

In 1988 he toured Europe, and released the album Sabenza, with Robbie Jansen, Paul Abrahams (bassist) and Jack Momple, who had all left American-influenced jazz in search of their Cape roots. Recorded in one week, this album changed perceptions about local jazz and includes some Cape Jazz jewels. It was followed by the album Monwabisi, Coetzee's second solo project. It was recorded in difficult times for the artist as he sought to establish his name away from previous successful associations. In the period between leaving his former Pacific Express associates and playing only sporadically for Ibrahim, Coetzee and bass player Paul Abrahams worked together as a duo. Many of the works on this album were arranged and written by them.

After Abdullah Ibrahim's return to South Africa from exile, Coetzee regularly performed in Ibrahim's various ensembles. The band Sabenza was active on the local scene, and regularly featured bassist Paul Abrahams, guitarist James Kibby, and drummer Vic Higgins.

B: was Coetzee's third solo album, released at about the time of his death in March 1998. This album contains some of his best work and includes contributions from players who worked with him for many years.

Basil Coetzee died during the night of 11 March 1998, after a long struggle with cancer, survived by five children and six grandchildren. His funeral took place on Saturday 14 March 1998 in Mitchell's Plain, and he is buried in the Garden of Eden in Ottery. Abdullah Ibrahim was one of those who paid tribute to Basil's memory at his funeral, announcing plans for the establishment of a Basil Manenberg Coetzee Music Academy in his memory. Coetzee's son, Basil Coetzee, Jr., played saxophone in the service.

Albums

Basil Coetzee's recording years spanned 1962–97, playing both tenor saxophone and flute. He has 18 recording sessions to his name, but his own compositions appear only on his Mountain Records releases. These albums include:

Sabenza MOU522 - 1988 
Monwabisi MOU592 - 1993 
B: MOU7522 - 1998
Passport - The Best of Basil Coetzee - 2014 (Digital only)

References

External links
 South African Music
 Mountain Records

1944 births
1998 deaths
Musicians from Cape Town
Cape Coloureds
South African people of Dutch descent
South African jazz saxophonists
20th-century saxophonists